John Greig is a Scottish footballer.

John Greig may also refer to:

John Greig (basketball) (born 1961), NBA basketball player
J. G. Greig (1871–1958), English cricketer
John Greig (mathematician) (1759–1819), English mathematician
John Greig (representative) (1779–1858), Representative from New York
John Greig (bishop) (1925–1938), Bishop of Gibraltar then Guildford
John Russell Greig (1889–1963), Scottish veterinarian
John Keiller Greig (1881–1971), British figure skater
John Greig (minister), 17th century minister

See also
John Gregg (disambiguation)